Wisma Darul Iman is Terengganu's state secretariat building, in Malaysia. It is located at Jalan Sultan Ismail in Kuala Terengganu, the state capital. It locates among the offices of Menteri Besar, State Secretary, and is home of Terengganu State Legislative Assembly. The building is second tallest structure in the state.

See also
 State governments of Malaysia

State secretariat buildings in Malaysia
Buildings and structures in Terengganu
Terengganu State Legislative Assembly